The Coalition of Eight Reformist Parties refers to the political alliance of eight reformist parties that endorsed a joint electoral list for 2020 Iranian legislative election in Tehran electoral district. 

The group was formed after the main umbrella group of the camp, the Reformists' Council for Policymaking, declared that it won't compile a list as a result of vast disqualifications by the Guardian Council, while allowing the parties within to form their own coalitions. It was one of the two lists spawned from the camp, the other being Friends of Hashemi.

The coalition was initially supposed to be formed by twelve parties, and its tentative title was 'Reformists in the Capital'. At last, four of those parties were not present in the coalition and the name Etelaf Barayeh Iran was selected for the list. It was headed by Majid Ansari of Association of Combatant Clerics, and included incumbents such as Mostafa Kavakebian of the Democracy Party and Alireza Mahjoub of the Worker House.

The result of the election was a major blow to the coalition, as all of the candidates were defeated by a wide margin amid the lowest ever turnout recorded in the history of Islamic Republic of Iran.

Parties in coalition
The eight parties were:
Democracy Party
Worker House
Islamic Labour Party
Islamic Iran Solidarity Party
Islamic Association of Teachers of Iran
Assembly of Educators of Islamic Iran
National Unity and Cooperation Party of Islamic Iran
Freedom Party

References

2020 establishments in Iran
Political party alliances in Iran
Reformist political groups in Iran
Electoral lists for Iranian legislative election, 2020